Solvitur ambulando  is a Latin phrase which means "it is solved by walking" and is used to refer to a problem which is solved by a practical experiment. It is often attributed to Saint Augustine.

Citations
The argument is retold by Pushkin in his eight line poem "Motion" (1825).

The phrase appears early in Lewis Carroll's "What the Tortoise Said to Achilles", where Achilles uses it to accentuate that he was indeed successful in overtaking Tortoise in their race to empirically test one of Zeno's paradoxes of motion. This passage also appears in Douglas Hofstadter's book Gödel, Escher, Bach (1979).

In Dorothy L. Sayers's Clouds of Witness (1926), during the Duke of Denver's trial before the House of Lords, the Lord High Steward suggests (to laughter) solvitur ambulando to determine whether the decedent crawled or was dragged to a different location, as this was a matter of dispute between the prosecution and the defense.

The phrase is also cited in The Songlines (1986) by Bruce Chatwin in its first meaning. Chatwin, who "passionately believed that walking constituted the sovereign remedy for every mental travail", learned it from Patrick Leigh Fermor and immediately wrote it down in his notebook.

The phrase is discussed multiple times and at some length in The Tao of Travel (2011) by Paul Theroux. It also appears in the writings of Aleister Crowley, and Oliver Sacks. It is the motto of the Royal Air Forces Escaping Society.

See also
 Argumentum ad lapidem
 Management by walking around
 Kisa Gotami

Notes

References
.

External links 
 Merriam-Webster Online



Latin words and phrases
Adages
Walking